The 2019 Big East Conference men's soccer season was the seventh season for the realigned Big East Conference. Including the history of the original Big East Conference, this was the 24th season of men's soccer under the "Big East Conference" name. The regular season began on August 30 and concluded on November 2.

Entering the season, Georgetown were the defending conference tournament champions, while Creighton were the defending conference regular season champions. Georgetown successfully defended their Big East Tournament title, and also won the regular season.

Four Big East teams earned berths into the NCAA Tournament, where Georgetown won the NCAA Tournament Championship in penalty kicks against Virginia. This was Georgetown's first national championship in men's soccer, and their first College Cup appearance since 2012. Elsewhere, St. John's and Providence reached the Sweet Sixteen, losing to Virginia and Clemson, respectively, while Butler was eliminated in the first round by West Virginia.

Background

Previous season

Coaching changes 
Ahead of the 2019 season, Creighton head coach Elmar Bolowich was hired by professional soccer club, Jacksonville Armada FC. Johnny Torres was hired to replace Bolowich.

Head coaches

Preseason

Preseason poll 
The preseason poll was released on August 21, 2019.

Preseason national polls 
The preseason national polls were released in July and August 2019.

Preseason All-Conference Teams 
All conference teams were announced in conjunction with the preseason poll.

Regular season

Early season tournaments 

Early season tournaments will be announced in late Spring and Summer 2019.

Postseason

Big East Tournament 

The 2019 Big East Tournament was held from November 9–17, 2019. Georgetown won the championship against Providence.

NCAA Tournament 

The NCAA Tournament will begin in November 2019 and conclude on December 17, 2019.

Rankings

National rankings

Regional rankings - USC East Region

Awards and honors

Player of the week honors

Postseason honors

All-Americans

To earn "consensus" status, a player must win honors based on a point system computed from the four different all-America teams. The point system consists of three points for first team, two points for second team and one point for third team. No honorable mention or fourth team or lower are used in the computation. The top five totals plus ties are first team and the next five plus ties are second team.

2020 MLS Draft

The 2020 MLS SuperDraft was held on January 9, 2020.

Homegrown players 

The Homegrown Player Rule is a Major League Soccer program that allows MLS teams to sign local players from their own development academies directly to MLS first team rosters. Before the creation of the rule in 2008, every player entering Major League Soccer had to be assigned through one of the existing MLS player allocation processes, such as the MLS SuperDraft.

To place a player on its homegrown player list, making him eligible to sign as a homegrown player, players must have resided in that club's home territory and participated in the club's youth development system for at least one year. Players can play college soccer and still be eligible to sign a homegrown contract.

No players in the Big East Conference signed homegrown contracts.

References

External links 
 Big East Men's Soccer

 
2019 NCAA Division I men's soccer season